Wilkins Run is an unincorporated community in Licking County, in the U.S. state of Ohio.

History
A post office was established at Wilkins Run in 1858, and remained in operation until 1902. The community was named for Henry and Daniel Wilkins, early settlers.

References

Unincorporated communities in Licking County, Ohio
1858 establishments in Ohio
Populated places established in 1858
Unincorporated communities in Ohio